Keith Perrins (born 17 January 1931) is an Australian cricketer. He played in four first-class matches for Queensland in 1960/61.

See also
 List of Queensland first-class cricketers

References

External links
 

1931 births
Living people
Australian cricketers
Queensland cricketers
Sportspeople from Rockhampton
Cricketers from Queensland